Pierre Barillet (24 August 1923 – 8 January 2019) was a French playwright.

Biography
Barillet was born in Paris, France. Passionate about theatre since childhood, he wrote his first play, Les Héritiers, in 1945 after being a law student. It was followed by Les Amants de Noël, performed at the Théâtre de Poche. He also worked as a radio broadcaster, reading novels and plays with Agnès Capri. He first experienced success in 1951 with Le Don d'Adèle, which he wrote along with Jean-Pierre Gredy. The play was performed over a thousand times. Over the next several decades, Barillet would develop what he was most famous for, Boulevard theatre. Certain of his plays were adapted to Broadway, including  Fleur de cactus (Cactus Flower, written by Abe Burrows) and Quarante carats (Forty Carats).

In the 1980s, Barillet appeared in television shows, including Malesherbes, avocat du roi, and Condorcet.

In the 1990s, he wrote biographies, such as Les Seigneurs du rire, about Robert de Flers, Gaston Arman de Caillavet, and Francis de Croisset. Quatre années sans relâche was about theatrical life in France during their German occupation in World War II. À la ville comme à la scène was an autobiography about the years he spent writing and performing in plays.

Barillet was an officer of the Ordre des Arts et des Lettres and a Knight of the Legion of Honor.

Personal life
Barillet was married to comedian Roland Oberlin.

Film adaptations
, directed by Émile Couzinet (France, 1951, based on the play Le Don d'Adèle)
, directed by André Hunebelle (France, 1958, based on the play Ami-ami)
Cactus Flower, directed by Gene Saks (USA, 1969, based on the play Fleur de cactus)
40 Carats, directed by Milton Katselas (USA, 1973, based on the play Quarante carats)
Potiche, directed by François Ozon (France, 2010, based on the play Potiche)
Just Go with It, directed by Dennis Dugan (USA, 2011, based on the play Fleur de cactus)

Screenwriter
 Beauties of the Night (dir. René Clair, 1952)

References

External links

1923 births
2019 deaths
20th-century French dramatists and playwrights
Writers from Paris
Chevaliers of the Légion d'honneur
Officiers of the Ordre des Arts et des Lettres